The following is a list of notable individuals who were born in and/or have lived in Great Bend, Kansas.

Academia
 Joan Bondurant (1918–2006), political scientist, spy
 Jack Kilby (1923–2005), co-inventor of integrated circuit (IC), 2000 Nobel Prize laureate in physics
 Steve Kufeld (1939–1997), astronomer, inventor

Arts and entertainment
 Karrin Allyson (1963– ), jazz singer, pianist
 Nicholas Barton (1983– ), filmmaker
 Bruce Helander (1947– ), artist
 Oscar Micheaux (1884–1951), author, film director
 Roy Stryker (1893–1975), photographer, economist

Politics
 Jim Denning (1956–), Majority Leader of the Kansas Senate
 Joseph W. Henkle, Sr. (1906–1983), Lieutenant Governor of Kansas
 Roger Marshall (1960– ), U.S. Representative from Kansas; U.S Senator from Kansas
 Jerry Moran (1954– ), U.S. Senator from Kansas

Sports

American football
 Steve Crosby (1950– ), running back, coach
 Damian Johnson (1962– ), offensive lineman
 Monte Robbins (1964– ), punter

Baseball
 John R. Keennan (1940–2015), longtime baseball scout for the Los Angeles Dodgers club
 Ted Welch (1892–1943), pitcher

Other sports
 Steve Gotsche (1961– ), golfer
 John Keller (1928–2000), 1952 gold medal-winning U.S. Olympic basketball player

See also

 Lists of people from Kansas

References

Great Bend, Kansas
Great Bend